The Carmel Clay Public Library, also known as the Carmel Library, is a major public library in Carmel, Indiana. The Library is located on 55 4th Avenue S.E. near Carmel High School, and hosts various free academic resources, such as classes, daycare, and activities.

Early history 
The Carmel Library was unofficially created in 1896 by the Wednesday Literary Club, largely organized by a school teacher named Luther Haines. The library was officially founded in 1904 by a group of trustees. The library implemented a system in which readers would pay a dollar a year to access a collection of 500 books, with Ida Johnson running the library. A grant of US$11,000 was given to the library on March 14, 1913, to expand the building by the Carnegie Corporation. The building was largely constructed between 1911 and 1914. The building was later transformed into a restaurant entitled "Woody's Library Restaurant", with books still present at the building.

Modern history 
In 1972, the Carnegie library was replaced by a larger building. That facility was renovated in 1986, doubling its size, and was renamed Carmel Clay Public Library in reference to the city of Carmel and Clay Township.

The present , two-story facility was constructed between 1997 and 1999. Its architectural style is described as modernist.

On November 7, 2016, Bob Swanay became director of the Carmel Library.

External links

References

Carnegie libraries in Indiana
Buildings and structures in Indiana
Library buildings completed in 1904
Education in Hamilton County, Indiana